Edona Bilali  is an Albanian politician. She is currently serving as the Minister of State for entrepreneurship protection in the Albanian government. She was appointed Minister of entrepreneurship protection  since September 10, 2021. Edona Bilali graduated with a masters in science in 2010 from Faculty of Economics, University of Tirana, and then went on to study for a master's degree, also in Tirana, Albania at Hult International Business School, in the field of International Business. She is also Member of the Parliament of Albania since 2021.

References 

Living people
Government officials of Albania
Albanian political people
Government ministers of Albania
21st-century Albanian politicians
University of Tirana alumni
1989 births